Nelson Sardelli (born September 30, 1934) is a Brazilian-born singer-comedian of Italian descent. He was an entertainer in Las Vegas. On 28 June 2008, he was awarded the Golden Pillow Award from the International Entertainer School of Las Vegas. He also acted in films including Myra Breckinridge and The Professionals. His fund-raiser event for mentally disabled children "Starshine" became an annual spectacle in Atlantic City.

In Sardelli's personal life, he was involved with actress Jayne Mansfield and the couple almost married. As of September 20, 2019 (his 85th birthday) he lives in Las Vegas.

Filmography

References

External links
 Official website

1934 births
Living people
Brazilian emigrants to the United States
American male singers
American male film actors
American people of Italian descent
Musicians from Las Vegas